Henry Bonham (1749–1800) was an English landowner and cricket lover. He played one game for Hampshire when their matches were organised by the Hambledon Club.

He was born to John Bonham of Petersfield, Hampshire, one of a family of two boys and two girls. The Bonhams were a well-known and well-to-do Hampshire family. Henry bought the Buriton estate in 1798 from Lord Stawell, who had previously acquired it from the historian Edward Gibbon. He was appointed High Sheriff of Hampshire for 1794–95.

He was very fond of cricket and belonged to the Hambledon Club, the forerunner of Hampshire Cricket Club, where he was Steward six times and also Secretary. Bonham played one first-class match in 1778 as a gentleman amateur against Surrey.

On his death in 1800 he was buried at East Meon. Buriton passed to his brother Thomas who willed it on his own death to his cousin John Carter. Carter then changed his name to Bonham-Carter.

References

External sources
Henry Bonham at CricketArchive

1749 births
1800 deaths
People from Petersfield
English cricketers
Hampshire cricketers
English cricketers of 1701 to 1786
High Sheriffs of Hampshire